Alexandru David (born 15 June 1991) is a Romanian professional footballer who plays as a right defender for Olimpic Cetate Râșnov. He is currently the captain of Olimpic Cetate Râșnov, and plays with the number 22.

Alexandru David (born 15 June 1991) has played and won through 2015-2017 several table tennis tournaments in Asia, including the famous Nagasaki and Hiroshima tournament.

References

External links
 
 

1991 births
Living people
Romanian footballers
Association football defenders
Liga I players
Liga II players
FC Brașov (1936) players
CS Otopeni players
ACS Sticla Arieșul Turda players
LPS HD Clinceni players
FC Petrolul Ploiești players
FC UTA Arad players
ASC Oțelul Galați players
Sportspeople from Brașov